These are the results of the Women's eight competition, one of six events for female competitors in Rowing at the 2004 Summer Olympics in Athens.

Women's eight

Heats – 15 August

Heat 1
: Kate Johnson, Samantha Magee, Megan Dirkmaat, Alison Cox, Caryn Davies, Laurel Korholz, Anna Mickelson, Lianne Nelson, Mary Whipple (coxswain) 5:56.55 , WB -> Final A
: Rodica Florea, Viorica Susanu, Aurica Bărăscu, Ioana Papuc, Liliana Gafencu, Elisabeta Lipă, Georgeta Damian, Doina Ignat, Elena Georgescu (coxswain) 5:56.77 -> Repechage
 Elke Hipler, Britta Holthaus, Maja Tucholke, Anja Pyritz, Susanne Schmidt, Nicole Zimmermann, Silke Günther, Lenka Wech, Annina Ruppel (coxswain) 5:59.75 -> Repechage
: Sarah Outhwaite, Jodi Winter, Catriona Oliver, Monique Heinke, Julia Wilson, Sally Robbins, Vicky Roberts, Kyeema Doyle, Katie Foulkes (coxswain) 6:02.77 -> Repechage

Heat 2
: Froukje Wegman, Marlies Smulders, Nienke Hommes, Hurnet Dekkers, Annemarieke van Rumpt, Annemiek de Haan, Sarah Siegelaar, Helen Tanger, Ester Workel (coxswain) 6:04.10 -> Final A
: Yu Fei, Luo Xiuhua, Cheng Ran, Yan Xiaoxia, Wu You, Yang Cuiping, Gao Yanhua, Jin Ziwei, Zheng Na (coxswain) 6:06.20 -> Repechage
: Anna-Marie de Zwager, Pauline van Roessel, Jacqui Cook, Andréanne Morin, Roslyn McLeod, Karen Clark, Romina Stefancic, Sabrina Kolker, Sarah Pape (coxswain) 6:12.40  -> Repechage

Repechage
18 August
Repechage 1
: Rodica Florea, Viorica Susanu, Aurica Bărăscu, Ioana Papuc, Liliana Gafencu, Elisabeta Lipă, Georgeta Damian, Doina Ignat, Elena Georgescu (coxswain) 6:03.99 -> Final A
: Elke Hipler, Britta Holthaus, Maja Tucholke, Anja Pyritz, Susanne Schmidt, Nicole Zimmermann, Silke Günther, Lenka Wech, Annina Ruppel (coxswain) 6:06.86 -> Final A
: Sarah Outhwaite, Jodi Winter, Catriona Oliver, Monique Heinke, Julia Wilson, Sally Robbins, Vicky Roberts, Kyeema Doyle, Katie Foulkes (coxswain) 6:09.64 -> Final A
: Yu Fei, Luo Xiuhua, Cheng Ran, Yan Xiaoxia, Wu You, Yang Cuiping, Gao Yanhua, Jin Ziwei, Zheng Na (coxswain) 6:09.87 -> Final A
: Anna-Marie de Zwager, Pauline van Roessel, Jacqui Cook, Andréanne Morin, Roslyn McLeod, Karen Clark, Romina Stefancic, Sabrina Kolker, Sarah Pape (coxswain) 6:15.18

Final – 22 August

References

External links
Official Olympic Report

Women's Eight
Women's Eight
Women's events at the 2004 Summer Olympics